The Cathedral of the Dormition, or the Kutaisi Cathedral, more commonly known as Bagrati Cathedral (or Bagratis tadzari), is an 11th-century cathedral in the city of Kutaisi, in  the Imereti region of Georgia. A masterpiece of medieval Georgian architecture, the cathedral suffered heavy damage throughout centuries and was reconstructed to its present state through a gradual process starting in the 1950s, with controversial conservation works concluding in 2012. These works prompted UNESCO to remove the cathedral from its list of World Heritage sites. A distinct landmark in the scenery of central Kutaisi, the cathedral rests on the Ukimerioni Hill. It is considered one of the four Great Cathedrals of the Georgian Orthodox world.

History
Bagrati Cathedral was built in the early years of the 11th century, during the reign of King Bagrat III, due to which it was called "Bagrati", i.e., Bagrat's cathedral. An inscription on the north wall reveals that the floor was laid in "chronicon 223", i.e., 1003. In 1692, it was devastated by a cannonball shot by Ottoman troops who had invaded the Kingdom of Imereti. The incident caused the cupola and ceiling to collapse.

Conservation and restoration works, as well as archaeological studies at the cathedral began in the 1950s under the leadership of a Georgian architect Vakhtang Tsintsadze. The restoration works headed by Tsintsadze were divided into six stages and continued for several decades through 1994. That same year in 1994 Bagrati Cathedral, together with the Gelati Monastery, was included in UNESCO's World Heritage Site list as a single entity. In 2001, ownership of the cathedral was transferred from the Georgian state to the Georgian Orthodox Church. It is presently of limited use for religious services, but attracts many pilgrims and tourists. It is also frequently used as a symbol of the city of Kutaisi, being one of its main tourist attractions.

Present state and conservation issues

In July 2010 UNESCO added Bagrati cathedral to its list of endangered world heritage sites in part because of the continuing reconstruction, which it feared would affect the structural integrity and authenticity of the site. Even before the reconstruction works, in 2008 ICOMOS was concerned about the deteriorating state of Bagrati, but it commended that any conservation efforts by the Government should not include a type of reconstruction which would affect the site's historical value. In 2011 UNESCO urged the Georgian government authorities to develop a rehabilitation strategy that would reverse some of the changes made to the site in recent years, but it acknowledged that these alterations may be "almost irreversible". In 2013, architect Andrea Bruno was awarded a Georgian state gold medal for his role in the Bagrati Cathedral reconstruction and was subsequently recognized for this project with the University of Ferrara Domus International Prize for Restoration and Conservation. UNESCO removed Bagrati Cathedral from its World Heritage sites in 2017, considering its major reconstruction detrimental to its integrity and authenticity.

Gallery

Burials 
 George I of Georgia

See also

 Gelati Monastery
 World Heritage Sites in Georgia
 World Heritage Sites in Danger

References 

Georgian Orthodox cathedrals in Georgia (country)
11th-century Eastern Orthodox church buildings
Buildings and structures in Kutaisi
Tourist attractions in Imereti
Immovable Cultural Monuments of National Significance of Georgia
Church buildings with domes
Former World Heritage Sites